Cabinet of Joko Widodo may refer to:
 Working Cabinet (2014–2019)
 Onward Indonesia Cabinet